Rainer Falenti (born 15 February 1973) is an Austrian former professional tennis player.

Falenti, who had a best singles world ranking of 193, made his only ATP Tour main draw appearance at the 1993 Austrian Open Kitzbühel, where he lost his first round match to Federico Sánchez.

ITF Futures titles

Singles: (1)

References

External links
 
 

1973 births
Living people
Austrian male tennis players